Jericho Shinde is a Zambian coach and former footballer, nicknamed "Russian Tank". He was a star player for Nkana Red Devils, now Nkana F.C. Jericho won four league titles and was also a kingpin in Zambia’s midfield in the eighties. After retirement, Shinde coached Nkana, Kalulushi Modern Stars and Power Dynamos.

Playing career
Shinde was still a student at Kitwe’s Chamboli Secondary School when he made his debut for Rhokana as a 17-year-old in 1977. He initially played on the left side of midfield, and he made his international debut in August 1981 at the age of 21 in a CAN qualifier against Morocco in Rabat, when he preplaced the injured Alex Chola in a match which Zambia lost 2-1 but won the return leg 2-0 to book a ticket to CAN 82.
By this time, Shinde was playing in a central midfield position and though he was a deep-lying midfielder for the national team, he assumed a more attack-minded role for his club, wearing the number 10 shirt for the Red Devils. He was part of Zambia’s team at CAN 1982 and was the star performer as Rhokana now rechristened Nkana Red Devils won the inaugural Premier league title in 1982 without losing a single game, and three more titles in 1983, 1985 and 1986. He was part of Zambia’s CECAFA winning team in December 1984 in Uganda, scoring a goal against Tanzania in the group stage.

Shinde was at his best when Zambia defeated Cameroun 4-1 in a World Cup qualifier in 1985 in Lusaka, bossing the midfield to telling effect. He was in the team that defeated Nigeria 1-0 on aggregate to qualify to CAN 1986 and he featured at the tournament where Zambia did not make it past the group stage. He played his last game for Zambia against Malawi in an All Africa Games Qualifier in April 1987. In his last game for the Zambia national team, he suffered a knee-injury that ended his playing career pre-maturely-the untold story.

Coaching career
He took up coaching in the early 1990s first at Nkana as one of the assistants under Moses Simwala after which he coached another Zambian Premier League side Kalulushi Modern Stars. Shinde then moved to Nkana’s bitter rivals, defending league champions Power Dynamos in 1995, replacing Webby Chilufya who had left for a coaching course in Europe.

When Dynamos recorded some indifferent results in the league, Shinde had a traumatic experience when fans blamed him for the team’s performances and one of them went as far as following him to his home and pulling a gun on him. 
When Power surrendered their title to Mufulira Wanderers at the end of the season, Shinde was dismissed and Chilufya reassumed coaching duties and declared that if he had been in charge throughout the season, Dynamos would not have lost the league. Shinde gave no response until a year later when Chilufya was fired at the end of the 1996 season when Dynamos finished third, 19 points behind champions Wanderers. He had the last word, saying that he hoped Chilufya had learnt a lesson, that there were ups and downs in the coaching job.

Shinde later coached Nkana, Afrisport FC and Botswana side TAFIC F.C.. He is currently coaching Nkana's feeder team Young Nkana.

References

External links

Living people
People from Kitwe
Zambian footballers
Zambia international footballers
Zambian football managers
1982 African Cup of Nations players
1986 African Cup of Nations players
1959 births
Association football midfielders